Lam Bun-Ching (b. Macau, 1954) is a Chinese American composer, pianist, and conductor.

Early life and training 
Lam holds a B.A. degree in piano performance from the Chinese University of Hong Kong (1976). She obtained a scholarship from the University of California at San Diego, where she studied composition with Bernard Rands, Robert Erickson, Roger Reynolds, and Pauline Oliveros, earning a Ph.D. in 1981.

Career 
In 1981, she was invited to join the music faculty of the Cornish College of the Arts in Seattle, where she taught until 1986. She has also served as the Jean MacDuff Vaux Composer-in-Residence at Mills College in Oakland, California, and in 1997 she served as a visiting professor of composition at Yale University and at Bennington College in Vermont.
 
Her music has been recorded on the CRI, Tzadik, Nimbus, Koch International Classics, Sound Aspect, and Tellus labels.

Lam divides her time between Paris and New York.

Works
 Chamber opera Wenji: Eighteen Songs of a Nomad Flute "文姬" 2002 to a libretto bu Xu Ying.

References

External links
Bun-Ching Lam official site

Women classical composers
1954 births
Living people
20th-century classical composers
21st-century classical composers
Hong Kong women classical composers
Hong Kong classical composers
Macau people
Cornish College of the Arts faculty
Pupils of Robert Erickson
Pupils of Roger Reynolds
Pupils of Pauline Oliveros
20th-century women composers
21st-century women composers